Frank Thomas Mildren (July 8, 1913 – September 14, 1990) was a United States Army four-star general who served as Commander, Allied Land Forces South East Europe (COMLANDSOUTHEAST) from 1971 to 1973. Mildren was born on July 8, 1913 and graduated from the United States Military Academy in 1939.

During the Vietnam War he served as deputy commanding general, United States Army Vietnam.

Promoted to four star rank on April 1, 1971, he retired from the army in 1973. Mildren died on September 14, 1990 and was buried in Fort Sam Houston National Cemetery.

References

United States Army generals
United States Military Academy alumni
1913 births
1990 deaths
Burials at Fort Sam Houston National Cemetery